LAER - Líneas Aéreas Entre Ríos was an Argentine airline based in Paraná, Entre Ríos, Argentina.

Destinations
LAER operated the following services (as of April 2013):

 Buenos Aires - Aeroparque Jorge Newbery Hub
 Concordia - Comodoro Pierrestegui Airport
 Goya - Goya Airport
 Mercedes - Mercedes Airport
 Paraná - General Justo José de Urquiza Airport Hub
 Reconquista - Daniel Jukic Airport

Fleet

The fleet pf LAER consisted of the following aircraft:

See also
List of defunct airlines of Argentina

References

External links

Official Web

Defunct airlines of Argentina
Airlines established in 1980
Airlines disestablished in 2002
Entre Ríos Province
2002 disestablishments in Argentina
Argentine companies established in 1980